Destiny (translit. al-Maṣīr) is a 1997 French-Egyptian historical drama film directed by Youssef Chahine. It was screened out of competition at the 1997 Cannes Film Festival. The film was selected as the Egyptian entry for the Best Foreign Language Film at the 70th Academy Awards, but was not accepted as a nominee.

The film is about Averroes, a 12th-century philosopher from Andalusia who would be known as the most important commentator on Aristotle.

The film is set in Córdoba and depicts the relationship between the Caliph and Averroes, who is one of his most trusted advisors. Religious fanatics start gaining control and begin influencing the Caliph's decisions, leading to the persecution of the philosopher, and to political unrest in Andalusia.

Cast
 Nour El-Sherif as Averroes
 Laila Eloui as Manuella
 Mahmoud Hemida as Al-Mansur, The Caliph
 Safia El Emari as Averroes' Wife 
 Mohamed Mounir as Marwan
 Khaled El Nabawy as Al-Nasir, The Crown Prince
 Seif El Dine as Abdullah The Caliph's Brother
 Abdalla Mahmoud as Borhan
 Ahmed Fouad Selim as Cheikh Riad
 Hani Salama as Abdalla
 Magdi Idris as Emir of the Sect
 Ahmed Moukhtar as Bard
 Sherifa Maher as Manuella's Mother
 Fayek Azzab as Al-Razi
 Hassan El Adl as Gaafar
 as Youssef
 Ingi Abaza as Sarah

See also
 List of historical drama films
 List of submissions to the 70th Academy Awards for Best Foreign Language Film
 List of Egyptian submissions for the Academy Award for Best Foreign Language Film

References

External links

 Roger Ebert (review)

1997 films
1997 drama films
1990s adventure drama films
Films about philosophers
Films about freedom of expression
Films about Islam
Epic films based on actual events
1990s Arabic-language films
1990s French-language films
Films set in the 12th century
Films set in Spain
Religious epic films
Egyptian biographical drama films
Biographical films about philosophers
Films directed by Youssef Chahine
French biographical drama films
Islamic comedy and humor
Historical epic films
Cultural depictions of Averroes
1997 multilingual films
Egyptian multilingual films
French multilingual films
1990s French films